The 2010–11 Marquette Golden Eagles men's basketball team represented Marquette University in the 2010–11 NCAA Division I men's basketball season. Marquette was coached by Buzz Williams in his second year at the school and played their home games at the Bradley Center in Milwaukee as members of the Big East Conference. They finished the season 22–15, 9–9 in Big East play to finish in a three-way tie for ninth place. They lost in the quarterfinals of the Big East tournament to Louisville. They received an at-large bid in the NCAA tournament where they defeated Xavier and Syracuse to advance to the Sweet Sixteen where they were defeated by North Carolina.

Previous season 
The Golden Eagles finished the 2009–10 season 22–12, 11–7 in Big East play to finish in a tie for fifth place. They received an at-large bid to the NCAA tournament where they lost in the First Round to Washington.

Preseason
On June 24, former Marquette star Lazar Hayward was selected by the Washington Wizards with the 30th pick of the first round of the 2010 NBA draft. Shortly thereafter, he along with Nemanja Bjelica were traded to the Minnesota Timberwolves in exchange for Trevor Booker and Hamady Ndiaye.

On October 20, 2010, at Big East Media Day, Marquette was picked to finish in an eighth-place tie with Louisville in the Big East Preseason Coaches' Poll, receiving 121 points.

Roster

Schedule and results
 
|-
!colspan=9 style=| Exhibition

|-
!colspan=9 style=| Regular Season

|-
! colspan=9 style=|Big East tournament

|-
!colspan=9 style=|NCAA tournament

Notes

Marquette Golden Eagles
Marquette Golden Eagles men's basketball seasons
Marquette
Marquette
Marquette